Saint-Beauzire is a commune in the Puy-de-Dôme department in Auvergne in central France.

Population

Economy 
The headquarters of Groupe Limagrain, an international agricultural co-operative group, specialized in field seeds, vegetable seeds and cereal products, are located in Saint-Beauzire.

A science park hosting biotechnology companies is located in Saint-Beauzire: Biopôle Clermont-Limagne.

See also
Communes of the Puy-de-Dôme department

References

Saintbeauzire